El Matmar District is a district of Relizane Province, Algeria.

Districts of Relizane Province